Alfred Gottschalk (22 April 1894 – 4 October 1973) was a German biochemist who was a leading authority in glycoprotein research. During his career he wrote 216 research papers and reviews, and four books.

Gottschalk was born in Aachen, the third of four children to Benjamin and Rosa Gottschalk. He choose to study medicine, from 1912 he attended the Universities of Munich, Freiburg im Breisgau and Bonn; the War interrupted his studies, but he completed them in 1920 graduating MD from the University of Bonn. He completed clinical work experience at the medical schools of Frankfurt am Main and Würzburg and physiology-biochemistry studies at Bonn, that led to his first publications, an award from the University of Madrid and an invitation to work at the Kaiser Wilhelm Institute for Experimental Therapy and Biochemistry with Carl Neuberg.

In 1923 he married Lisbeth Berta Orgler; together they had one son. They separated in 1950.

Gottschalk left the Kaiser Wilhelm Institute for Biochemistry in 1926 to become Director of the Biochemical Department at the General Hospital in Stettin. He left the hospital in 1934 following upheaval in Nazi Germany and entered private practice, left for England in the spring of 1939, and on to Melbourne in July. He was offered a position as a biochemist by Charles Kellaway Director of the Walter and Eliza Hall Institute; he also taught biochemistry and organic chemistry at the Melbourne Technical College and later at the University of Melbourne. In 1945 he became a naturalized British citizen. In 1949 he received a DSc from the University of Melbourne.

At the Walter and Eliza Hall Institute Gottschalk collaborated with Frank Macfarlane Burnet. They discovered neuraminidase. He was elected a Fellow of the Australian Academy of Science in 1954.

On his retirement in 1959, he was invited by Frank Fenner to research at the John Curtin School of Medical Research at the Australian National University. He left Canberra for Germany in 1963, where he was appointed Guest-Professor at the Max Planck Institute for Virus Research in Tübingen. He continued active research and for his contributions to science was elected to the Fellowship of the American Association for the Advancement of Science in 1967 and received an honorary doctorate from the University of Münster (MD) in 1969.

He died in Tübingen on 4 October 1973.

The Gottschalk Medal for medical research awarded by the Australian Academy of Science is named in his honour.

References

1894 births
1973 deaths
People from Aachen
German biochemists
Fellows of the American Association for the Advancement of Science
Fellows of the Australian Academy of Science
Australian biochemists
University of Bonn alumni
Ludwig Maximilian University of Munich alumni
WEHI alumni
German emigrants to Australia